The Muskogee Indians was a South Central League (1906) and Oklahoma State League (1912) minor league baseball team based in Muskogee, Oklahoma, United States.

Ben Tincup, who pitched for four seasons in the major leagues, played for the Indians. In 1906, they were managed for part of the season by Nixey Callahan; in 1912, they were skippered for part of the year by Kid Speer.

References

Baseball teams established in 1906
Defunct minor league baseball teams
Professional baseball teams in Oklahoma
1906 establishments in Indian Territory
Muskogee, Oklahoma
1912 disestablishments in Oklahoma
Baseball teams disestablished in 1912
Defunct baseball teams in Oklahoma